Hoehn Peak is a peak rising to  at the head of Matterhorn Glacier on Roa Ridge; the peak marks the southern end of Morelli Ridge in the Asgard Range of Victoria Land, Antarctica. It was named by the Advisory Committee on Antarctic Names (1997) after Robert C. Hoehn of the Civil Engineering Department at the Virginia Polytechnic Institute and State University, who studied the Lake Bonney ecosystem during the 1974–75 field season.

References

Mountains of the Asgard Range
McMurdo Dry Valleys